Khamul may refer to:

Khamûl, a Nazgûl or Ringwraith, one of the fictional characters in the works of J. R. R. Tolkien
Khamul (genus), a genus of wasps

See also
Kamul, a village in Ilam Province, Iran.